Nguyễn Mạnh Tuấn (born 6 June 1947) is a Vietnamese former swimmer. He competed in two events at the 1980 Summer Olympics. He was also the flag bearer for the Vietnamese team. He is from Thái Bình Province.

References

External links
 

1947 births
Living people
Vietnamese male swimmers
Olympic swimmers of Vietnam
Swimmers at the 1980 Summer Olympics
People from Thái Bình province